Junín Municipality may refer to:
 Junín, Cundinamarca, Colombia
 Junín Municipality, Táchira, Venezuela

Municipality name disambiguation pages